Berthil ter Avest (born 19 November 1970 in Wierden) is a Dutch retired football player. He is currently head coach of Dutch amateur side Bon Boys.

Club career
In addition to Dutch teams, the left-sided midfielder also played in the Bundesliga for Borussia Mönchengladbach.

He was released by De Graafschap in 2003 and an Achilles injury made him quit playing altogether.

References

External links
 Career stats

1970 births
Living people
People from Wierden
Association football wingers
Dutch footballers
FC Twente players
Roda JC Kerkrade players
FC Groningen players
Borussia Mönchengladbach players
De Graafschap players
Bundesliga players
2. Bundesliga players
Eredivisie players
Dutch expatriate footballers
Expatriate footballers in Germany
Dutch expatriate sportspeople in Germany
Footballers from Overijssel